Rachel Axler is an American screenwriter and playwright. In television, her credits include Childrens Hospital, How I Met Your Mother, The Goodwin Games, New Girl, Bored to Death, Parks and Recreation, Veep, and The Daily Show.

Early life and education
Axler was born in Queens, New York. She graduated from Hunter College High School in 1995 and Williams College in 1999. She received a Master of Fine Arts degree from the University of California, San Diego, As a playwright her works include the plays Smudge and Archaeology.

Career
Axler has won four Primetime Emmy Awards. In 2006 and 2009, Axler won two Emmys for her work on The Daily Show as a part of the writing team. In 2016 and 2017, she won two Emmys for Outstanding Comedy Series for her work as Supervising Producer on Veep. She was also nominated for, but did not win, an Emmy in 2007 for The Daily Show.

References

External links

American dramatists and playwrights
American television writers
Emmy Award winners
Living people
Hunter College High School alumni
University of California, San Diego alumni
American women dramatists and playwrights
American women television writers
Year of birth missing (living people)
Place of birth missing (living people)
Screenwriters from New York (state)
Screenwriters from California
21st-century American women